The men's Greco-Roman middleweight competition at the 1932 Summer Olympics in Los Angeles took place from 4 August to 7 August at the Grand Olympic Auditorium. Nations were limited to one competitor. This weight class was limited to wrestlers weighing up to 79kg.

This Greco-Roman wrestling competition followed the same format that was introduced at the 1928 Summer Olympics, using an elimination system based on the accumulation of points. Each round featured all wrestlers pairing off and wrestling one bout (with one wrestler having a bye if there were an odd number). The loser received 3 points. The winner received 1 point if the win was by decision and 0 points if the win was by fall. At the end of each round, any wrestler with at least 5 points was eliminated.

Schedule

Results

Round 1

Both bouts were won by decision. The winners each had 1 point, the losers each had 3. Poilvé, however, retired due to injury.

 Bouts

 Points

Round 2

Cadier had a bye due to Poilvé's retirement. The two first-round winners faced off, with Kokkinen winning by a decision to move to 2 points while Földeák had 4 points after the loss.

 Bouts

 Points

Final round

Kokkinen beat Cadier to finish 3–0 and with 2 points. Földeák had a bye, and finished with the silver medal at points after having beating Cadier earlier by decision and lost to Kokkinen. Cadier finished 0–2 but with the bronze medal.

 Bouts

 Points

References

Wrestling at the 1932 Summer Olympics